Vampire Kisses is a series of books written by Ellen Schreiber. Vampire Kisses is about a 16-year-old girl named Raven Madison who is a goth misfit in her polo-wearing, ordinary, town. When an old abandoned mansion finally gets new residents, the rumors start to spread. Everyone in the small town, which Raven refers to as “Dullsville”, believes that the new neighbors are actually secret bloodthirsty vampires. Even Raven, who has always loved vampires since she was little, believes the rumors. But one day, she encounters the attractive yet mysterious Alexander Sterling that lives in the mansion and feels like he is the only person that actually understands her. The two very quickly fall in love, but still, the question remains; are the Sterlings really vampires?

The first book in the series, Vampire Kisses, was one of the American Library Association's young adult book picks for 2004.

Books in series
Vampire Kisses 
Kissing Coffins
Vampireville
Dance With a Vampire
The Coffin Club
Royal Blood
Love Bites
Cryptic Cravings
Immortal Hearts

Vampire Kisses: Blood Relatives series
Vampire Kisses: Graveyard Games series

Reception
Critical reception for the Vampire Kisses series has been mixed to positive, with Teenreads calling the first book a "wonderfully funny story". Kirkus Reviews stated that the book was "cheesily written" but that it was "awkwardly endearing". Publishers Weekly praised the first novel, stating that while the ending was "a bit rushed, elsewhere the comic timing is dead-on". The Comic Book Bin reviewed Vampire Kisses, calling it a "breezy teen romance". The Magazine of Fantasy and Science Fiction praised Kissing Coffins, the second book in the series, writing "It’s not a deep, dark read, so it might be too light for a die-hard Goth, but it’s not dull by any means." The Horn Book Guide panned the series' 8th volume, stating "purple prose and little real tension are strikes against this tale of goth-girl wish fulfillment".

Anime News Network reviewed volume one of the manga adaptation Blood Relatives, criticizing the series' "irksome clichés" but praising artist Rem's artwork.

Manga adaptation 
In 2007 a manga adaptation of Schreiber's Vampire Kisses series was published by Tokyopop's English branch, with the series eventually being published in German as well. Tokyopop chose artist Rem to illustrate the series, with the artist previously winning their 2003 Rising Stars of Manga contest. Harper Collins picked up the North American rights to the series after the closure of TokyoPop, replacing the series' previous artist Rem with Xian Nu Studios. The series was one of the 2009 New York Times bestselling manga for the week of September 26.

A four Manga, "Vampire Kisses: Graveyard Games", listed on Amazon from September 27, 2011. Though not much else can be found about this volume. But apparently, it takes place after the events of blood relatives. Three manga in the "Vampire Kisses: Blood Relatives" series have been published.

Volume list

Characters of the Vampire Kisses Series
Raven Madison - Main character
Alexander Sterling - Raven's boyfriend
Becky Miller - Raven's best friend
Trevor Mitchell - Raven's childhood nemesis, who constantly flirts with Raven 
Jameson - The Sterlings' butler
Jagger Maxwell - Alexander's nemesis
Luna Maxwell - Jagger's twin sister  
Valentine Maxwell - Luna and Jagger's little brother
William Madison (a.k.a. "Billy Boy", "Nerd Boy") - Raven's little brother
Sebastian Camden - Alexander's childhood friend
Scarlet - Raven's friend from the club 
Onyx - Raven's friend from the club 
Paul Madison - Raven's and Billy's dad
Sarah Madison - Raven's and Billy's mom
Constantine Sterling - Alexander and Stormy's father 
Cassandra Sterling - Alexander and Stormy's mother 
Athena "Stormy" Sterling - Alexander's little sister 
Nightmare - Raven's Cat
Phantom - Stormy's Cat
Henry - Billy Boy's friend
Romeo - Luna's boyfriend
Ruby - Jameson's girlfriend
Matt Wells - Becky's boyfriend
Aunt Libby - Raven's aunt 
old man Jim - graveyard keeper
Phoenix - Mystery Man in the club
Mrs. Peevish
Janice Armstrong

Characters Description

Raven Madison 
Raven Madison, the 16-year-old goth daughter of Sarah and Paul Madison and elder sister of Billy (Nerd Boy) Madison, is a fictional character in Ellen Schreiber's Vampire Kisses series. Raven is known for being the only gothic girl in all of Dullsville. She has mid-length jet black hair. Her favorite color is black; her favorite movies of all time are Dracula and Kissing Coffins. She lives in a town called, "Dullsville" and has a best friend named Becky Miller whom she has known since the third grade when she saw Becky crying on the front steps one day because she thought that her mom forgot to pick her up. 

When Raven is pretty young, she decides that her lifelong arch-nemesis is Trevor Mitchell because he hates Raven and she terms it as hate at first sight. They go out of their way to humiliate each other. On her 16th birthday, a mystery family moves into a creepy mansion in her town and they become her point of obsession. She devotes all of her time to find out if they are really vampires or not and breaks into the mansion one day after a disastrous run-in with the Creepy butler (Jameson) on Halloween. Raven first saw her future boyfriend Alexander Sterling, who she nicknamed, "Gothic Guy", on the night of her classmate Matt's party.

Alexander Sterling 
Alexander Sterling, son of Constantine & Cassandra Sterling, is a vampire in Ellen Schreiber's Vampire Kisses series. He is known to have dark, chocolate eyes, long jet-black hair, & to be an excellent painter. He moved into the mansion on Benson Hill during his future girlfriend Raven Madison's sophomore year. He first met Raven when he was leaving the cemetery painting by his grandmother's grave when Becky Miller almost ran him over with her truck.

Trevor Mitchell 
Trevor Mitchell is Raven's popular, khaki-clad, rich, gorgeous, and mean arch-nemesis. But truth is, he's more attracted to her than repelled by her. He's had a crush on her ever since they were children. Trevor even kept the one present Raven ever got him. He goes out of his way to humiliate her but is just wanting her attention. He nicknamed Raven his "Monster Girl." While Raven hates him truly, Trevor is Raven's secret admirer. Trevor steals Raven's first kiss at Matt's party. He dresses up as a vampire on Halloween to impress Raven because he knows she loves vampires and also he plans to spray paint the Mansion and blame it on Raven for humiliating him. He even buys the painting of Raven which was put for auction by Alexander to pay money for buying the mansion.

Ultimately he ends up confessing his love for Raven only to see her become a vampire.

References

External links

Official publisher page
Official author site
 

American vampire novels
American young adult novels
Paranormal romance novel series
Horror novel series
American fantasy novel series
Young adult novel series
Vampires in comics
Tokyopop titles
HarperCollins books
American romance novels